Crow Creek may refer to the following in the United States:

Bodies of water
 Crow Creek (Alaska), a tributary of Turnagain Arm
 Crow Creek (South Dakota), the site of the Crow Creek massacre
 Crow Creek (South Platte River tributary), in Wyoming and Colorado
 Crow Creek (Uwharrie River tributary), a stream in Montgomery and Randolph counties, North Carolina

Other
 Crow Creek National Forest in Wyoming
 Crow Creek Indian Reservation in South Dakota

See also
 Crows Creek, Missouri